Eto is a Japanese surname and given name. People with the name include:

Surname 
 Akinori Eto (born 1955), Japanese politician
 Akira Eto (born 1970), Japanese baseball player
 Batara Eto (born 1979), Indonesian-Japanese businessman
 Hajime Eto (born 1973), Japanese footballer
 Izumi Eto (born 1935), Japanese sprint canoer
 Jun Etō (1932–1999), Japanese literary critic
 Ken Eto (1919–2004), Japanese-American mobster
 Kimio Eto (1924–2012), Japanese musician
 Kohei Eto (born 1982), Japanese basketball coach
 Koki Eto (born 1988), Japanese boxer
 Kosaburo Eto (1946–1969), Japanese social activist
 Kyōsuke Eto (1881–1917), Japanese naval officer
, Japanese sport wrestler
, Japanese footballer
 Misa Etō (born 1993), Japanese idol and tarento
 Naomi Eto (born 1972), Japanese volleyball player
 Rie Eto (born 1973), Japanese singer
, Japanese cult leader and serial killer
 Seiichi Eto (born 1947), Japanese politician
 Seishirō Etō (born 1941), Japanese politician
 Shinichi Eto (1937–2008), Japanese baseball player
 Etō Shinpei (1834–1874), Japanese statesman
 Takami Eto (1925–2007), Japanese politician
 Takashi Eto (born 1991), Japanese athlete
 Taku Etō (born 1960), Japanese politician
 Toshiya Eto (1927–2008), Japanese violinist
 Yu Eto (born 1983), Japanese footballer

Given name 
 Eto Mori (born 1968), Japanese novelist
 Eto Nabuli (born 1988), Fijian-Australian rugby footballer

Fictional characters
 Eto Demerzel, a recurring character in Isaac Asimov's books

Eto Yoshimura, an antagonist In the manga Tokyo Ghoul

See also
 ETO (disambiguation)

Japanese-language surnames